The International Broadcasting Bureau Greenville Transmitting Station is the transmitting station for Voice of America, in Greenville, North Carolina. It is also known as the Edward R. Murrow Transmitting Station or Voice of America Greenville Transmitting Station.  Originally at three sites, only one, site B, is in current use. Greenville was chosen because of its remoteness from other communication services, proximity of large quantities of reliable electric power, type of terrain and suitability for construction, and availability of property  which ensured the best electronic propagation conditions. The transmitting station provides shortwave broadcasts for U.S. government-funded, nonmilitary and international broadcasting. The main target areas for the station's shortwave broadcasts are Latin America, Cuba, the Caribbean, North Africa, and Africa.

History

In the early 1950s, VOA planned for the construction of a high-power shortwave complex on the East Coast of the United States to provide coverage to Europe, Africa, and South America. By 1954, the project was suspended, but the need continued to grow. The transmitters in Wayne, New Jersey, and Brentwood and Schenectady, New York continued to become more inadequate every year. Congress gave approval for a new transmission station in 1958. That same year site exploration found 38 potential locations. Final selection was made a year later, and the land was acquired. The site had to be south enough to avoid the northern auroral zone, but close enough to Washington D.C. to keep transmitting cost to a minimum. Because of the number of transmitters needed, it was decided to split the transmission site into two, site A and site B. The receiving facilities, program master control, communications center, and station main offices were located at site C. Construction began on February 15, 1960 and was completed December 7, 1962, at a cost of $23–24 million. All three stations were dedicated by President John F. Kennedy and became operational on February 8, 1963.  The new facilities doubled the VOA's power and employed 100 people around the clock.  The cost was offset by the closure of the transmitters in Wayne, New Jersey, and Brentwood and Schenectady, New York. From January 1988 until mid-1997, the station was the network training facility for new Foreign Service Officers, who spent six months in training at the stations prior to being sent overseas. The Greenville facilities became the most powerful international broadcaster in the world, in both physical size and radio frequency
energy. Each of the sites housed nine transmitters – three of 500,000 watts, three of 250,000 watts, and three of 50,000 watts.

Site A 

Site A, which comprised , is near Beargrass in Beaufort County. Its last use was in 2006. Sites A and B are the only known places where the Henslow's sparrow breeds reliably in North Carolina, ownership was transferred to the North Carolina Wildlife Resources Commission and the remaining antenna structures were demolished. The demolition of the site can be viewed via YouTube.

Site B  

Site B, which comprises , is near BlackJack in Pitt County. Site B broadcasts news and music 24 hours a day to over 125 million people. The project cost around $206 million.

After the 2010 Haiti earthquake, Site B increased their Creole airtime to the Caribbean from two hours to 15 hours a day.

Site C 

Site C originally had  near Falkland, North Carolina. This site is the only receiving station in the area. In 1968, this station was rededicated as Edward R. Murrow Transmitting Station, in honor of Edward R. Murrow, former director of the United States Information Agency. In 1971, a private agribusiness, with the help of a local congressman, buried toxic waste from a fire at a chemical storage warehouse. Personnel stopped using the site in 1985. In 1987, the site became a gateway Earth station for the Global Satellite Interconnect System. In 1994, the General Services Administration sold the site, minus  that contained the toxic waste, to the State of North Carolina and local governments. The site closed on March 31, 1995, due to budget reductions and changes in technology. In 1998, satellite dishes were placed on the Cohen Building in Washington, D.C. Greenville then became a receive-only station and acted as a backup to the headquarters site. It was decommissioned in 1999 and sold to East Carolina University in 2001. Today the land is used by the Department of Biology for research and ROTC for training. Also, the main office of the North Carolina Agromedicine Institute, and a facility for the Office of State Archaeology. Blackbeard's flagship, Queen Anne's Revenge artifacts are being restored there.

References

East Carolina University
Voice of America